Rui Vaz is a settlement in the central part of the island of Santiago, Cape Verde. In 2010 its population was 1,078. It is situated at 809 m elevation, 2 km south of São Jorge dos Órgãos and 4 km west of São Domingos. It is part of the  municipality of São Domingos.

References

São Domingos Municipality, Cape Verde
Villages and settlements in Santiago, Cape Verde